Prosiccia trifasciata is a moth in the family Erebidae first described by Max Gaede in 1925. It is found in New Guinea.

References

Nudariina
Moths described in 1925